Women in the United States military can refer to:
Women in the United States Armed Forces
Women in the United States Army
Women in the United States Marine Corps
Women in the United States Navy
Women in the United States Air Force
Women in the United States Space Force
Women in the United States Coast Guard

See also 

 Women in the military
 Women in the military by country
 Women in the military in the Americas